Hannah Walters is an English actress and producer.

Career
Walters began her acting career in 2006, with a small role in The Thieving Headmistress. She followed this with appearances as Trudy in the Shane Meadows film This Is England and its continuing series, This Is England '86, This Is England '88 and This Is England '90. Walters is best known for her role as DC Megan Riley in the ITV 1 crime drama series, Whitechapel, a role she portrayed for 12 episodes.

In 2019, Walters appeared in the short film, Boiling Point, which, two years later, went on to become a feature-length film of the same name. Walters is credited as being an executive producer for the film, alongside her husband, Stephen Graham. In the United Kingdom, the film earned $107,525 from fifty-three theaters in its opening weekend; the film went on the amass $1,142,493 in total box office worldwide.

In 2021, Walters appeared as Sonia McNally in Time, the wife of her real-life husband's character. 

In 2022, Walters appeared, as Jean, in four episodes of BBC comedy PRU.

Walters is due to feature in Sweet Sue, a film currently in post-production and starring Maggie O'Neill, Tony Pitts and Harry Trevaldwyn.

In October 2022, it was announced that there would be a BBC sequel series of Boiling Point. Walters will feature as Emily in the series set six months after the premise of the original feature film.

Personal life
Walters married actor Stephen Graham on 6 June 2008; they had met and started dating while both were training at the Rose Bruford College of Theatre & Performance. They currently reside in Ibstock, Leicestershire, having previously lived in the Beckenham area of London. They have a son and a daughter. Graham has been open about how his dyslexia means that Walters will help him learning lines, and helps to choose his next projects based on the scripts he receives.

Filmography

References

External links 
 
 

Category:Alumni of Rose Bruford College

Living people
21st-century English actresses
British actresses
English film actresses
English television actresses
Year of birth missing (living people)